Shabier Kirchner (born 1987/1988) is an Antiguan cinematographer and director based between London, New York, and the Caribbean. He won a BAFTA for his work on Steve McQueen's five-part anthology series Small Axe (2020).

Early life
Kirchner grew up in the Falmouth Harbour area of Antigua island. He also spent some of his childhood in Germany, the home country of his father Bert, who owns Papa Zouk in St. John's. Kirchner had undiagnosed dyslexia and ADHD growing up. Struggling academically, he was introduced to camera work through his father, an underwater photographer and producer, as well as through a school workshop with a Dutch filmmaker. At 18, Kirchner enrolled in an introductory program at a film school in Vancouver before opting to learn through practical experience instead, dropping out with four of his classmates, with whom he made the short film Memoirs of the Blue.

Filmography

Film

Television

Awards and nominations

References

External links
 
 Shabier Kirchner at Rathaus Films

Living people
Antigua and Barbuda expatriates in England
Antigua and Barbuda expatriates in the United States
Antigua and Barbuda filmmakers
Antigua and Barbuda people of German descent
BAFTA winners (people)
People from Saint Paul Parish, Antigua
People with dyslexia
Year of birth missing (living people)